Bouret-sur-Canche (literally Bouret on Canche) is a commune in the Pas-de-Calais department in the Hauts-de-France region in northern France.

Geography
A farming village located 20 miles (32 km) west of Arras on the D329 road, by the banks of the river Canche.

Population

Sights
 The church of St. Vaast, dating from the eighteenth century.
 An eighteenth-century chapel.

See also
Communes of the Pas-de-Calais department

References

Communes of Pas-de-Calais